Eli Hoyle House is a historic plantation house located near Dallas, Gaston County, North Carolina.  It was built about 1830–1833, and is a two-story, five bay, Federal-style frame dwelling.  It has a side-gable roof, exterior brick end chimneys, and sits on a stone foundation.  It was built by Eli Hoyle (1801–1844), great-grandson of Pieter Hieyl who built the nearby Hoyle Historic Homestead.

It was listed on the National Register of Historic Places in 1998.

References

Plantation houses in North Carolina
Houses on the National Register of Historic Places in North Carolina
Federal architecture in North Carolina
Houses completed in 1833
Houses in Gaston County, North Carolina
National Register of Historic Places in Gaston County, North Carolina